Maya Devi Neupane (or Mayadevi Neupane) is a Nepali communist politician and a member of the House of Representatives of the federal parliament of Nepal. She was elected from CPN UML under the Proportional representation system.

References

Living people
21st-century Nepalese women politicians
21st-century Nepalese politicians
Communist Party of Nepal (Unified Marxist–Leninist) politicians
Nepal Communist Party (NCP) politicians
Place of birth missing (living people)
Nepal MPs 2017–2022
Communist Party of Nepal (Unified Socialist) politicians
1958 births